Golden idol may refer to:

 Golden Idol, item from the Indiana Jones franchise
The Case of the Golden Idol, a 2022 video game
The Golden Idol, a 1954 American adventure film

See also
 Golden calf, an idol (a cult image) made by the Israelites when Moses went up to Mount Sinai